This page lists company lists ordered by the stock exchange the companies are listed on.

List
 List of companies listed on the Athens Stock Exchange
 List of companies listed on the Australian Securities Exchange
 List of companies listed on the Barbados Stock Exchange
 List of companies listed on the Beirut Stock Exchange
 List of companies listed on the Colombo Stock Exchange
 List of companies listed on the Hong Kong Stock Exchange
 List of companies listed on Ibovespa
 List of companies listed on the Irish Stock Exchange
 Companies listed on the Istanbul Stock Exchange
 List of companies listed on the London Stock Exchange
 FTSE 100 Index
 FTSE 250 Index
 FTSE SmallCap Index
 List of companies listed on the Mongolian Stock Exchange
 NASDAQ-100#Components
 List of companies listed on the National Stock Exchange of India
 Companies listed on the New York Stock Exchange (0-9)
 Companies listed on the New York Stock Exchange (A)
 Companies listed on the New York Stock Exchange (B)
 Companies listed on the New York Stock Exchange (C)
 Companies listed on the New York Stock Exchange (D)
 Companies listed on the New York Stock Exchange (E)
 Companies listed on the New York Stock Exchange (F)
 Companies listed on the New York Stock Exchange (G)
 Companies listed on the New York Stock Exchange (H)
 Companies listed on the New York Stock Exchange (I)
 Companies listed on the New York Stock Exchange (J)
 Companies listed on the New York Stock Exchange (K)
 Companies listed on the New York Stock Exchange (L)
 Companies listed on the New York Stock Exchange (M)
 Companies listed on the New York Stock Exchange (N)
 Companies listed on the New York Stock Exchange (O)
 Companies listed on the New York Stock Exchange (P)
 Companies listed on the New York Stock Exchange (Q)
 Companies listed on the New York Stock Exchange (R)
 Companies listed on the New York Stock Exchange (S)
 Companies listed on the New York Stock Exchange (T)
 Companies listed on the New York Stock Exchange (U)
 Companies listed on the New York Stock Exchange (V)
 Companies listed on the New York Stock Exchange (W)
 Companies listed on the New York Stock Exchange (X)
 Companies listed on the New York Stock Exchange (Y)
 Companies listed on the New York Stock Exchange (Z)
 List of companies listed on the Oslo Stock Exchange
 Companies listed on the Shenzhen Stock Exchange
 Companies listed on the Singapore Exchange
 List of members of the Tokyo Stock Exchange
 Companies listed on the Toronto Stock Exchange (0-9)
 Companies listed on the Toronto Stock Exchange (A)
 Companies listed on the Toronto Stock Exchange (B)
 Companies listed on the Toronto Stock Exchange (C)
 Companies listed on the Toronto Stock Exchange (D)
 Companies listed on the Toronto Stock Exchange (E)
 Companies listed on the Toronto Stock Exchange (F)
 Companies listed on the Toronto Stock Exchange (G)
 Companies listed on the Toronto Stock Exchange (H)
 Companies listed on the Toronto Stock Exchange (I)
 Companies listed on the Toronto Stock Exchange (J)
 Companies listed on the Toronto Stock Exchange (K)
 Companies listed on the Toronto Stock Exchange (L)
 Companies listed on the Toronto Stock Exchange (M)
 Companies listed on the Toronto Stock Exchange (N)
 Companies listed on the Toronto Stock Exchange (O)
 Companies listed on the Toronto Stock Exchange (P)
 Companies listed on the Toronto Stock Exchange (Q)
 Companies listed on the Toronto Stock Exchange (R)
 Companies listed on the Toronto Stock Exchange (S)
 Companies listed on the Toronto Stock Exchange (T)
 Companies listed on the Toronto Stock Exchange (U)
 Companies listed on the Toronto Stock Exchange (V)
 Companies listed on the Toronto Stock Exchange (W)
 Companies listed on the Toronto Stock Exchange (X)
 Companies listed on the Toronto Stock Exchange (Y)
 Companies listed on the Toronto Stock Exchange (Z)